The Chala LPG tanker disaster was a road transport accident that occurred on August 27, 2012, on Indian National Highway 17 (now NH 66) at Chala in the Kannur District of India's Kerala State. Some consider it the worst hazardous material road transport accident in India in terms of casualties. The accident occurred when an Indian Oil Corporation Limited (IOCL) LPG road tank truck hit a road lane divider, overturned and exploded, starting several building fires between 9:30 p.m. and 11 p.m. The accident caused the deaths of 20 people and injured another 15.

Background 
Indian Oil Corporation Limited (IOCL), owned by Government of India, is a diversified, integrated energy major with presence in all the streams of oil, gas and petrochemicals. 

IOCL transports liquefied petroleum gas (LPG) produced in its refineries to cylinder filling facilities through terrestrial pipelines, railway tank trains and road tank trucks. The Indian Oil Corporation (IOC) owned cylinder bottling plant in Chelari in Kozhikode district in Kerala receives LPG through road tank trucks from Mangalore LPG Import Facility (MLIF) owned by IOCL situated 264km away in Karnataka state. 

LPG tankers with drivers are supplied to IOCL by contractors. The safety of transportation and emergency services is managed by IOCL. Bullet shaped tanks mounted on trailer trucks normally have 17-ton LPG capacity in three compartments. Petroleum Rules 1976 require petroleum transportation vehicles to have a license from the Petroleum and Explosives Safety Organization (PESO).

National Highways in India are constructed and maintained by the National Highway Authority of India (NHIA) and State Public Works Department.{
  "type": "FeatureCollection",
  "features": [
    {
      "type": "Feature",
      "properties": {},
      "geometry": {
        "type": "Point",
        "coordinates": [
          75.42829227432777,
          11.848513419700142
        ]
      }
    }
  ]
}

Accident 
On August 12, 2012, between 9:30 p.m. and 10:00 p.m. an LPG truck coming from Mangalore to the Chelari filling station of IOCL in Kozhikode district hit a concrete road divider and overturned near Chala temple bus stop between Kannur and Thalasseri towns.

The lane division was installed to segregate traffic in opposite directions.  The concrete divider started at Chala temple bus stop - where the descend from hill levelled off - and extended 200 meters up to the next junction. The divider was constructed by fixing 50cm high concrete blocks along the center line. The dividers, originally  painted white and black strips, were blackened with vehicle exhausts. The concrete lane divider in Chala did not have a warning sign installed on it to indicate start of division or presence of obstruction in the middle of the road. In Kannur August night temperature is normally between 25oC to 28oC and humidity is above 80%. Mild rain was present during the time of accident. There were a few one and two storied commercial buildings on the north side of the highway and several houses on both sides. The nearest house was within 20m of the highway.

After the truck overturned the tank drain valve of one of the tank compartments broke and started leaking liquid LPG. The land on the south side is 2-3 meter and on the east side is 1 meter below the highway. The leaked liquid LPG and heavy gas flowed for 170 meters through an irrigation water canal parallel to the street on the south side of highway. This street connected the houses in coconut palm groves on the south side with the highway.  

The driver was able to exit the cabin and alert nearby residences before ignition. Most of the persons living around the accident spot evacuated their homes, moved away for some distance and stood on the street along the water canal.

Explosions and fire 
First ignition occurred between 10 to 20 minutes after overturning of the truck. This was a flash fire explosion in the gas spread around the overturned truck, in the water canal and in the low-lying area on the south side. The gas settled in the canal is said to have burnt for 1 to 2 minutes. Persons who had evacuated their houses but stood on the streets on the south and north side of the highway suffered burn injuries from the flash fire explosion that they hadn't expected. After the first explosion the fire subsided to a jet fire at the leaking portion of  the overturned bullet tank. During this period the neighborhood had attempted search and rescue in fire impacted houses.

Ten minutes after the first explosion and fire, the LPG bullet tank ruptured causing a more severe second explosion. This explosion formed huge fire balls and a half piece of the burning tank rocketed upward, flew over the coconut groves and fell 270 meters away. Burnt marks were visible on the trees along the flight path of the rocketed tank piece, indicating the compartment was possibly spilling fuel.

The fire damaged 20 houses and 23 shops. Seven houses suffered severe fire and explosion damage necessitating demolition. Eleven vehicles were gutted in the  fire.

Fire tenders of Kerala State Fire and Rescue services approached the accident site after the second explosion. Five fire tenders from Kannur (7km) and Thalasseri (15km) fire stations attended the incident.

Casualties 
Most of the victims suffered burns from the first flash fire explosion. These victims were the people who evacuated their houses but stood on the streets on the south and north side of the highway at some distance. They managed to flee the fire site and were rescued outside the fire area. There was no injury due to consequent building fires. Five people remained inside their  homes after the first blast and escaped unhurt from the zone of accident before the second blast.

Twenty victims died due to burn injuries in various hospitals in a period between 24 hours to 30 days from the time of the incident.  Dr. Promod Kumar has documented the medical management of the victims of the Chala disaster in Kasturba Hospital in Manipal. See Kumar P. Fire disaster following LPG tanker explosion at Chala in Kannur Burns.

Crisis management 
The tragedy caused local uproar and protest against government officials who visited the accident site. During his visit the State Chief Minister ordered removal of the road divider involved.  This action was later criticized as destruction of evidence.

Chief minister Shri. Oommen Chandy, his ministerial colleagues and Leader of Opposition Shri. V.S. Achuthanandan visited the accident spot, the hospitalized injured and the houses of those who died. Shri. V.S. Achuthanandan demanded that murder cases be filed against IOCL.

Several voluntary social organizations worked following months in the area to help restoration of the houses and rehabilitation of traumatized families.

Protest and blockade of LPG trucks occurred in several parts of the district for a few months. People demanded ending of LPG transport on roads in the state and manhandled truck drivers.  In response, the  Southern Region Bulk LPG Transport Owners’ Association called  a strike in September 2012.

IOCL paid compensation of Indian rupees 1 million (USD 14K) for each deceased.

Investigation 
Report of investigation conducted by IOCL is not publicly available. Enquiries conducted by the District Collector and State Government are accessible to the public.

Oil Industry Safety Directorate under Ministry of Petroleum and Natural Gas of India has published a case study in 2013 titled 'LPG Tank Truck road accident and subsequent BLEVE''' on Chala LPG tanker disaster. 

In press conferences after the accident Chief Minister of Kerala Shri. Oommen Chandy stated improper design of  the concrete lane divider was a significant cause of the disaster. Asianet News'' reported the fatigue of the lone driver and absence of illumination as other potential causes.  Shri. M. Ponnambalam, president of Southern Region Bulk LPG Transport Owners’ Association said that the accident happened due to bad roads and that driving through Kannur’s bad roads was a nightmare.

Twenty-two people gave statements in a magisterial enquiry conducted by Kannur District Collector Shri. Rathan Kelkar.The owner of the shop near the accident site stated in the enquiry that there had been no reflector on the road divider and that the divider was not visible at night due to poor lighting.In the same enquiry the Public Works Department (PWD) official concerned stated that the sign board warning was present. Nonconformance by LPG truck contractors to the IOCL requirement for two drivers in each LPG truck was also said to have contributed to the accident.

Improvements to LPG trucks 
IOCL announced that LPG trucks would be fitted with an excess flow valve inside the tank on the drain line. IOCL also announced its intention to enforce the requirement for two drivers for each LPG truck.

Second LPG tanker overturning 

In May 6, 2021 afternoon another filled LPG road tanker operated by IOCL overturned 200m away from site of 2012 incident. The truck capsized whist maneuvering 90 degree turn. Unlike August 12, 2012 incident, the leak was smaller and gaseous this time and did not ignite. Residences were evacuated from 500m radius and highway was closed for 12 hours until IOCL emergency recovery tanker removed the inventory from overturned leaking tanker.

References 

Road accidents and incidents
Disaster management
Disasters in Kerala